Good Samaritan Evangelical Lutheran Church is a Christian denomination in India. It has about 40,000 members. Its headquarters is in Bhadrachalam, Madhya Pradesh.
It has been founded in 1972. It is led by T. Esther Rani.
The other churches belonging to the United Evangelical Lutheran Church in India are:

Andhra Evangelical Lutheran Church
Arcot Lutheran Church
Evangelical Lutheran Church in Madhya Pradesh
Evangelical Lutheran Church in the Himalayan States
Gossner Evangelical Lutheran Church in Chotanagpur and Assam
Indian Evangelical Lutheran Church
Jeypore Evangelical Lutheran Church
Northern Evangelical Lutheran Church
South Andhra Lutheran Church
Tamil Evangelical Lutheran Church

References

External links
Website of the United Evangelical Lutheran Church in India

See also
Adivasi
Christianity in India

Christianity in Madhya Pradesh
Lutheranism in India
Christian organizations established in 1972
Lutheran World Federation members
Evangelical denominations in Asia
Affiliated institutions of the National Council of Churches in India